Real World (stylised as REAL WORLD) is Kokia's 11th studio album, released on March 31, 2010. Kokia travelled to the Tunisian Sahara for inspiration for songs on the album. Because of this, much of the promotional material is themed around her trip to Tunisia, including the album booklet and the music video for "The Woman."

Background

Before the album, three digital singles were released over eight months. Dubbed the Life Trilogy (Life Trilogy ～いのちの3部作～), the three singles featured message songs for humanity.  was the first of these, released in August. "Kimi o Sagashite" asked the question "What is life, and why does it disappear/why does the end come?" in its lyrics. "Single Mother" was an autobiographical story about the unreplaceable bonds Kokia has to her mother. The final, was released in March two weeks before the album's Japanese release. The song has a message that people have the power to change sadness and loneliness with kindness.

All three singles were billed as double A-sides, featuring four tracks and a digital booklet each. Each single featured an original B-side not listed in the title, as well as a cover of a Western artist's song (Louis Armstrong's "What a Wonderful World," Charlie Chaplin's "Smile" and The Beatles' "The Long and Winding Road" respectively). Only the first track from each EP features on the album.

This album is Kokia's first since her second greatest hits collection, Coquillage: The Best Collection II.

"U-Cha-Cha" is a song Kokia originally performed live in concerts in 2002, at her first solo concert "That's Why I Was Born."

Conception

Kokia first planned to release an album in March 2010, however had no solid plans for a theme. However, after sharing a meal with a Japanese cameraman friend of hers when she visited Paris for concerts (June 2009), he suggested she travel to Tunisia.

She travelled to Tunisia in November 2009 for roughly a week and a half. Inspired by the scenery, Kokia chose the themes of life and death, the Earth and about womanhood.

Eight of the 14 songs on the album were written about her experiences in Tunisia: "Birth," "Kodoku na Ikimono," "Kono Chikyū ga Marui Okage de," "Love Is Us, Love Is Earth," "Oto no Tabibito," "Real World," "Saishū Jōei" and "Watashi ga Mita Mono." The songs were inspired by many aspects of the trip, instead of solely from visiting the Sahara desert. "Birth" was inspired by a visit to the Chott el Djerid lake.

Recording for the Tunisia-inspired songs from the album began in late December, after Kokia finished her Jū Ni Gatsu no Okurimono tour. However, not all of them had been written by this point. The album was fully completed in late February.

Promotion

The song "Road to Glory: For Dragon Nest" was used as the theme song for the Hangame Japan online game Dragon Nest. Tachibana from the Dragon Nest Japan management team, when posting news about the theme song, believed the song fitted well with the world outlook in the game, and felt moved by the song.

A music video for the final track on the album, "The Woman," was created. It was based around footage of Kokia in the Tunisian Sahara that was filmed while the photos for the CD jacket were being taken. The song was specifically written before her trip to Tunisia, as a central song that summed up she wanted the album to become. The music video is Kokia's first in four years, since 2006's "" The video was to be shown from a screen on the Twin21 building in the Osaka Business Park during album promotion, at five points during the day.

In April, Kokia performed a tour in promotion for the album, Oto no Tabibito. It had four dates across Japan.

Reception

The album debuted at #14 on Oricon's daily album chart, however quickly slipped to the lower end of the top 50 during the week of release. It debuted at #44 on the weekly charts, selling 3,100 copies. The album charted for a further two weeks at #161 and #241 respectively, selling a further 1,000 copies in this time.

Critically, CDJournal described the album as "a work made with all her might, that records her feelings (on life, death, Tunisia, etc) just as they were, with real melodies."

Track listing

All songs written and produced by Kokia.

Japan Sales Rankings

Personnel

 Shigeo Fuchino - soprano saxophone
 Kei Haneoka - arranger, programming (#12-13)
 Yuya Haraguchi - acoustic guitar (#3), additional arrangement (#4), guitars (#4),
 Shigeyuki Hirano - director (anco & co.)
 Atsushi Kawahata - electric piano (#4)
 Hiroshi Kawasaki - mastering engineer (at Flair)
 Mikio Koike - visual co-ordination (Victor)
 Kokia - chorus arrangement, design, make-up, producer, songwriter, styling, vocals
 Sae Konno - piano (#12)
 Masahiro Kuniyoshi - download sales (Victor)
 Masumi Ito - arrangement/programming (#2, #7, #11)
 Syuichi Matsuura - publicist (Victor)
 Tsuyoshi Miyagawa - drums (#6, #8)
 Susumu Miyake - cello (#12)
 Yutaka Nakamura - photographer
 Kenji Nozaki - package sales (Victor)
 Mio Okamura Quartet - strings (#1)

 Hiroyasu Okasa - quena, siku (#3)
 Aki Okiyama - visual co-ordination
 Mitsutaka Saito - electric bass (#6), washtub bass (#8-9)
 Yoshikazu Sasahara - mixing engineer
 Katsuhiko Sato - guitars (#3)
 Shinozaki Strings - strings (#2, #7)
 Jin Sukegawa - A&R (Victor)
 Gen Tanabe - electric guitar (#5)
 Koichiro Tashiro - laúd & bandolin (#11)
 Tetsuro Toyama - acoustic guitar (#6), electric guitar (#14), guitars (#2, #8-9)
 Kiyohide Ura - arrangement/keyboards (#1, #6, #8-10, #14), piano (#13)
 Eri Yaguchi - design support
 Yasuhisa Yamamoto - arrangement/backing track recording (#3-5), percussion (#3-5, #9), programming (#3, #5)
 Kei Yasui - tin whistle (#11)

References
 

Kokia (singer) albums
2010 albums
Victor Entertainment albums
Japanese-language albums